Thomas William Sneddon Jr. (May 26, 1941 – November 1, 2014) was the district attorney of Santa Barbara County, California. He had more than two decades of experience as a District Attorney, and more than three decades of experience as a prosecutor. He is best known for leading two investigations of Michael Jackson on child sexual abuse allegations in 1993 and 2005. His most famous case was when he was prosecuting child molestation charges against entertainer Michael Jackson in the trial People v. Jackson in 2005, at the end of which Jackson was acquitted.

Life and career
Sneddon was born in Los Angeles in 1941 and grew up in Northern California. In 1963 Sneddon graduated from the University of Notre Dame, where he was on the boxing team, and in 1966 from UCLA Law School, where he met his wife. From 1967 to 1969 he served in the U.S. Army.

From November 1969 until May 1977, Sneddon served as a Deputy District Attorney in Santa Barbara County. In 1977, he was promoted to the position of Supervisor of Criminal Operations. On January 3, 1983, Sneddon became the 33rd District Attorney of Santa Barbara County and was re-elected without opposition for five terms. In 2010 he retired from the DA's office.

A father of 9 children, Sneddon was Chair of the Committee for Child Support Enforcement since its inception in 1991. He was presented with a "Director's Award" in 1995 by the California Family Support Council. A year later he was appointed co-chair of the National District Attorney's Child Support Committee and invited by the US Attorney General Janet Reno to be a member of the Presidential Commission's Federal Task Force to review and enhance federal criminal prosecutions for failure to pay child support.

Prosecution of Michael Jackson
His most publicized cases were his two investigations of Michael Jackson on child sexual abuse allegations in 1993 and 2003, 2004, and 2005. The first criminal investigation was closed with no charges; Jackson settled a related civil suit with a civil settlement of over $15 million to the plaintiff Jordan Chandler, who ceased cooperating with investigators after two grand juries returned a refusal to indict Jackson.

The second set of allegations against Jackson resulted in a trial which ended on June 13, 2005, with Jackson's acquittal. In 1995 Jackson wrote a song about him, titled "D.S." Sneddon denied ever listening to the song.

Jackson reportedly kept an “enemy list” on which Sneddon appeared, along with Rabbi Shmuley Boteach, illusionist Uri Geller, music executive Tommy Mottola, attorney Gloria Allred, and Janet Arvizo, mother of a Jackson accuser.

Death
Sneddon died on November 1, 2014. He was 73.

References

External links
 Thomas William Sneddon Jr. profile, Martindale.com; accessed November 2, 2014.

1941 births
2014 deaths
Deaths from cancer in California
People from Santa Barbara County, California
District attorneys in California
Michael Jackson
University of Notre Dame alumni
UCLA School of Law alumni
United States Army soldiers